St. Joseph's Convent School, Panchgani is an all-girls Catholic boarding school in Panchgani, Maharashtra.

History 

After 1857, the British were consolidating their hold on their Indian Empire. The hill stations were developed and Panchgani's bracing climate made it a popular health resort and an educational centre. St. Joseph’s Convent School was founded in October 1895 under the patronage of the Bishop of Poona and the Roman Catholic order of nuns, known as the Daughters of the Cross, making it one of the oldest existing schools in Panchgani.

Academics 

10th grade students take the Indian Certificate of Secondary Education examination.

The subjects that are offered are divided into three groups. Group I includes Compulsory Subjects - English, History, Civics & Geography, and Indian Language, Group II which includes any two from Mathematics, Science, Environmental Science, Computer Science, Agricultural Science, Commercial Studies, Technical Drawing, A Modern Foreign Language, A Classical Language and Economics, and Group III has any one from Computer Applications, Economic Applications, Commercial Applications, Art, Performing Arts, Home Science, Cookery, Fashion Designing, Physical Education, Technical Drawing Applications, Yoga, and Environmental Applications. All subjects have components of internal assessment, that are carried out by schools, on the basis of assignments/project work, practicals and coursework. There is 20% weightage for internal assessment in group I and II and 50% weightage for group III.

Co-curricular activities 

Sports at the school include basketball, table tennis, volleyball, hockey, badminton, etc. Students are required to take part in sports. Performing arts include Western and Indian music, choirs, solo singing, and traditional and modern instruments.

Notable alumni

 Nutan - Indian Film Actress
 Kajol - Indian Film Actress
 Zeenat Aman - Indian Film Actress
 Reita Faria - Miss World 1966
 Prachi Desai - Indian Film Actress
 Kim Sharma - Indian Film Actress
 Protima Bedi - Model and Classical Dancer

References

External links 
School website

Catholic boarding schools in India
Catholic secondary schools in India
Christian schools in Maharashtra
Boarding schools in Maharashtra
High schools and secondary schools in Maharashtra
Girls' schools in Maharashtra
Education in Satara district
Panchgani
Educational institutions established in 1895
1895 establishments in India
Girls boarding schools